In the fields of digital electronics and computer hardware, multi-channel memory architecture is a technology that increases the data transfer rate between the DRAM memory and the memory controller by adding more channels of communication between them. Theoretically, this multiplies the data rate by exactly the number of channels present. Dual-channel memory employs two channels. The technique goes back as far as the 1960s having been used in IBM System/360 Model 91 and in CDC 6600.

Modern high-end desktop and workstation processors such as the AMD Ryzen Threadripper series and the Intel Core i9 Extreme Edition lineup support quad-channel memory. Server processors from the AMD Epyc series and the Intel Xeon platforms give support to memory bandwidth starting from quad-channel module layout to up to octa-channel layout. In March 2010, AMD released Socket G34 and Magny-Cours Opteron 6100 series processors with support for quad-channel memory. In 2006, Intel released chipsets that support quad-channel memory for its LGA771 platform and later in 2011 for its LGA2011 platform. Microcomputer chipsets with even more channels were designed; for example, the chipset in the AlphaStation 600 (1995) supports eight-channel memory, but the backplane of the machine limited operation to four channels.

Dual-channel architecture 

Dual-channel-enabled memory controllers in a PC system architecture use two 64-bit data channels. Dual-channel should not be confused with double data rate (DDR), in which data exchange happens twice per DRAM clock. The two technologies are independent of each other, and many motherboards use both by using DDR memory in a dual-channel configuration.

Operation 
Dual-channel architecture requires a dual-channel-capable motherboard and two or more DDR, DDR2, DDR3, DDR4, or DDR5 memory modules. The memory modules are installed into matching banks, each of which belongs to a different channel. The motherboard's manual will provide an explanation of how to install memory for that particular unit. A matched pair of memory modules may usually be placed in the first bank of each channel, and a different-capacity pair of modules in the second bank. Modules rated at different speeds can be run in dual-channel mode, although the motherboard will then run all memory modules at the speed of the slowest module. Some motherboards, however, have compatibility issues with certain brands or models of memory when attempting to use them in dual-channel mode. For this reason, it is generally advised to use identical pairs of memory modules, which is why most memory manufacturers now sell "kits" of matched-pair DIMMs. Several motherboard manufacturers only support configurations where a "matched pair" of modules are used. A matching pair needs to match in:
 Capacity (e.g. 1024 MB). Certain Intel chipsets support different capacity chips in what they call Flex Mode: the capacity that can be matched is run in dual-channel, while the remainder runs in single-channel.
 Speed (e.g. PC5300). If speed is not the same, the lower speed of the two modules will be used. Likewise, the higher latency of the two modules will be used.
 Same CAS Latency (CL) or Column Address Strobe.
 Number of chips and sides (e.g. two sides with four chips on each side).
 Matching size of rows and columns.

Dual-channel architecture is a technology implemented on motherboards by the motherboard manufacturer and does not apply to memory modules. Theoretically any matched pair of memory modules may be used in either single- or dual-channel operation, provided the motherboard supports this architecture.

Performance 
Theoretically, dual-channel configurations double the memory bandwidth when compared to single-channel configurations. This should not be confused with double data rate (DDR) memory, which doubles the usage of DRAM bus by transferring data both on the rising and falling edges of the memory bus clock signals.

A benchmark performed by TweakTown, using SiSoftware Sandra, measured around 70% increase in performance of a quadruple-channel configuration, when compared to a dual-channel configuration. Other tests performed by TweakTown on the same subject showed no significant differences in performance, leading to a conclusion that not all benchmark software is up to the task of exploiting increased parallelism offered by the multi-channel memory configurations.

Ganged versus unganged 
Dual-channel was originally conceived as a way to maximize memory throughput by combining two 64-bit buses into a single 128-bit bus. This is retrospectively called the "ganged" mode. However, due to lackluster performance gains in consumer applications, more modern implementations of dual-channel use the "unganged" mode by default, which maintains two 64-bit memory buses but allows independent access to each channel, in support of multithreading with multi-core processors.

"Ganged" versus "unganged" difference could also be envisioned as an analogy with the way RAID 0 works, when compared to JBOD. With RAID 0 (which is analogous to "ganged" mode), it is up to the additional logic layer to provide better (ideally even) usage of all available hardware units (storage devices, or memory modules) and increased overall performance. On the other hand, with JBOD (which is analogous to "unganged" mode) it is relied on the statistical usage patterns to ensure increased overall performance through even usage of all available hardware units.

Triple-channel architecture

Operation 
DDR3 triple-channel architecture is used in the Intel Core i7-900 series (the Intel Core i7-800 series only support up to dual-channel). The LGA 1366 platform (e.g. Intel X58) supports DDR3 triple-channel, normally 1333 and 1600Mhz, but can run at higher clock speeds on certain motherboards. AMD Socket AM3 processors do not use the DDR3 triple-channel architecture but instead use dual-channel DDR3 memory. The same applies to the Intel Core i3, Core i5 and Core i7-800 series, which are used on the LGA 1156 platforms (e.g., Intel P55). According to Intel, a Core i7 with DDR3 operating at 1066 MHz will offer peak data transfer rates of 25.6 GB/s when operating in triple-channel interleaved mode. This, Intel claims, leads to faster system performance as well as higher performance per watt.

When operating in triple-channel mode, memory latency is reduced due to interleaving, meaning that each module is accessed sequentially for smaller bits of data rather than completely filling up one module before accessing the next one. Data is spread amongst the modules in an alternating pattern, potentially tripling available memory bandwidth for the same amount of data, as opposed to storing it all on one module.

The architecture can only be used when all three, or a multiple of three, memory modules are identical in capacity and speed, and are placed in three-channel slots. When two memory modules are installed, the architecture will operate in dual-channel architecture mode.

Supporting processors 

Intel Core i7:
 Intel Core i7-9xx Bloomfield, Gulftown
 Intel Core i7-9x0X Gulftown

Intel Xeon:
 Intel Xeon E55xx Nehalem-EP
 Intel Xeon E56xx Westmere-EP
 Intel Xeon ECxxxx Jasper Forest
 Intel Xeon L55xx Nehalem-EP
 Intel Xeon L5609 Westmere-EP
 Intel Xeon L5630 Westmere-EP
 Intel Xeon L5640 Westmere-EP
 Intel Xeon LC55x8 Jasper Forest
 Intel Xeon Wxxxx Bloomfield, Nehalem-EP, Westmere-EP
 Intel Xeon X55xx Nehalem-EP
 Intel Xeon X56xx Westmere-EP
 Intel Xeon x4xx v3
 Intel Pentium 14xx v3
 Intel Xeon x4xx v2
 Intel Pentium 14xx v2
 Intel Xeon x4xx
 Intel Pentium 14xx

Quad-channel architecture

Operation 
Quad-channel memory debuted on Intel's Nehalem-EX LGA 1567 platform of Xeon CPUs, aka Beckton in 2010, and was introduced to the high end product line on the Intel X79 LGA 2011 platform with Sandy Bridge-E in late 2011. DDR4 replaced DDR3 on the Intel X99 LGA 2011 platform, aka Haswell-E, and is also used in AMD's Threadripper platform. DDR3 quad-channel architecture is used in the AMD G34 platform and in the aforementioned Intel CPUs prior to Haswell. AMD processors for the C32 platform and Intel processors for the LGA 1155 platform (e.g. Intel Z68) use dual-channel DDR3 memory instead.

The architecture can be used only when all four memory modules (or a multiple of four) are identical in capacity and speed, and are placed in quad-channel slots. When two memory modules are installed, the architecture will operate in a dual-channel mode; When three memory modules are installed, the architecture will operate in a triple-channel mode.

Supporting processors 

AMD Threadripper:
 AMD Ryzen Threadripper 3rd gen 3990X
 AMD Ryzen Threadripper 3rd gen 3970X
 AMD Ryzen Threadripper 3rd gen 3960X
 AMD Ryzen Threadripper 2nd gen 2990WX
 AMD Ryzen Threadripper 2nd gen 2970WX
 AMD Ryzen Threadripper 2nd gen 2950X
 AMD Ryzen Threadripper 2nd gen 2920X
 AMD Ryzen Threadripper 1950X
 AMD Ryzen Threadripper 1920X
 AMD Ryzen Threadripper 1900X

AMD Epyc:
 Epyc 7003 series processors
 Epyc 7002 series processors
 Epyc 7001 series processors

AMD Opteron:
 Opteron 6300-series "Abu Dhabi" (32 nm)
 Opteron 6200-series "Interlagos" (32 nm)
 Opteron 6100-series "Magny-Cours" (45 nm)

Intel Core:
 Intel Core i9-10900X
 Intel Core i7-9800X
 Intel Core i9-7980XE
 Intel Core i9-7940X
 Intel Core i9-7900X
 Intel Core i7-7820X
 Intel Core i7-7800X
 Intel Core i7-6950X
 Intel Core i7-6900K
 Intel Core i7-6850K
 Intel Core i7-6800K
 Intel Core i7-5960X
 Intel Core i7-5930K
 Intel Core i7-5820K
 Intel Core i7-4960X
 Intel Core i7-4930K
 Intel Core i7-4820K
 Intel Core i7-3970X
 Intel Core i7-3960X
 Intel Core i7-3930K
 Intel Core i7-3820

Intel Xeon:
 Intel Xeon E5-x6xx v4
 Intel Xeon E7-x8xx v3
 Intel Xeon E5-x6xx v3
 Intel Xeon E7-x8xx v2
 Intel Xeon E5-x6xx v2
 Intel Xeon E7-x8xx
 Intel Xeon E5-x6xx

Hexa-channel architecture 

Supported by Qualcomm Centriq server processors, and processors from the Intel Xeon Scalable platform.

Octa-channel architecture 

Supported by Cavium ThunderX2 server processors, AMD's server processors from their Epyc platform, and the Threadripper PRO lineup of professional-class workstation processors from AMD Ryzen PRO product family.

See also 
 List of device bandwidths
 Lockstep (computing)

References

External links 
 .
 Everything You Need to Know About the Dual-, Triple-, and Quad-Channel Memory Architectures, November 2011, Hardware Secrets
 Memory Configuration Guide for X9 Series DP Motherboards Revised Ivy Bridge Update (Socket R & B2), January 2014, Super Micro Computer, Inc.
 DDR3 Memory Frequency Guide, May 2012, AMD (archived)

Computer memory
Intel x86 microprocessors

ca:Dual channel
de:Dual Channel
de:Triple Channel
es:Doble canal
it:Dual channel
ja:デュアルチャネル
pl:Dual channel
fa:معماری حافظه چند کاناله